Camp Beagle is a protest camp set up in July 2021 by animal rights activists outside of MBR Acres, a breeding facility for beagles used in laboratory research, in Wyton, Cambridgeshire. The protestors want the site to be closed down, the beagles freed and for vivisection in the United Kingdom to be ended.

Background 
MBR Acres is owned by the American company Marshall BioResources (MBR). Up to 2,000 beagles are bred at the facility each year; they are sold at the age of around 16 weeks to be used for drugs and chemical testing.

Since 2020, protests have been held around the facility, led by groups such as Camp Beagle UK and Free the MBR Beagles.

History 
The camp was first set up in July 2021; footage of dogs from the facility published by the Daily Mirror led to increased support of the campaign. The protestors argue that the facility is factory farming beagles; MBR has issued a statement asserting that the protestors are misinformed and that breeding of animals is essential for medical research. The statement also contends that the facility is both regulated and frequently inspected by the Home Office which enforces strict laws around animal welfare in research facilities.

Actors Ricky Gervais and Peter Egan have voiced their support for the facility to be closed down. In August 2021 The Times Newspaper published a letter signed by in support of MBR Acres and its contribution to medical research nineteen scientific societies and organizations.

On 28 August, Camp Beagle coordinated a protest with Animal Rebellion at Smithfield Market in London.

15 activists were arrested on 31 August for "suspected obstruction of the highway or of criminal damage."

Following a High Court injunction hearing instigated by MBR Acres, it was ruled, on 5 October, that the camp was allowed to remain, with the provision that activists must remain at least 10 metres from the gates.

A Freedom of Information Request revealed that Cambridge Constabulary spent  from 27 June to 14 September on policing the camp.

In November 2021, the singer Will Young handcuffed himself to the gates of the facility.

In December 2022, activists from Animal Rebellion freed 18 beagles from the facility.

See also 
 Consort beagles campaign
 Save the Hill Grove Cats
 Save the Newchurch Guinea Pigs
 Stop Huntingdon Animal Cruelty
 Shamrock Farm

References 

2021 protests
2022 protests
Animal rights protests
Animal testing in the United Kingdom
Animal welfare and rights in the United Kingdom
Anti-vivisection movement
Dog breeding
Dogs in the United Kingdom
Protest camps
Protests in England